Juke-Bar is a 1989 stop motion musical animated short about cockroaches who party inside a jukebox. The film is directed by Martin Barry and produced in Montreal by the National Film Board of Canada. Juke-Bar received the Genie Award for Best Animated Short at the 11th Genie Awards, along with the Special Jury Award and Public's Award at the Zagreb World Festival of Animated Films, the Silver Hugo in the Animation category at the Chicago International Film Festival and the best short film awards at the Carrousel international du film de Rimouski and Montreal World Film Festival.

References

External links
Watch Juke-Bar at NFB.ca
IMDB
FilmAffinity

Stop-motion animated short films
Quebec films
National Film Board of Canada animated short films
Animated films about insects
1989 films
Animated films without speech
Best Animated Short Film Genie and Canadian Screen Award winners
Canadian comedy short films
1980s animated short films
1989 animated films
Animated musical films
1990s Canadian films
1980s Canadian films